Gassmann or Gaßmann is a German surname. Notable people with the surname include:

Alessandro Gassmann (born 1965), Italian actor
Florian Leopold Gassmann (1729–1774), German-speaking Bohemian opera composer
Fritz Gassmann (1899–1990), Swiss mathematician and geophysicist
Georg Gaßmann (1910–1987), German politician
Eugen Scotoni-Gassmann (1873–1961), Austrian-born Swiss businessman from the construction, real estate and film industries

See also
Georg-Gaßmann-Stadion, multi-purpose stadium in the district of Ockershausen in Marburg, Germany
Gassmann triple, a group G together with two faithful actions on sets X and Y, such that X and Y are not isomorphic as G-sets but every element of G has the same number of fixed points on X and Y
Gasman (disambiguation)
Gasmann
Gassman

German-language surnames